Victor "Vic" Anthony Toweel (12 January 1928 – 15 August 2008) was a South African boxer and former undisputed World bantamweight champion. He was the first South African to hold a world title.

Personal
Victor Anthony Toweel was born on 12 January 1928 in Benoni, South Africa. He was the second eldest of six brothers and the son of Michael Joseph Toweel, who was of Lebanese descent.

Toweel's father, better known as Pappa Mike, taught his sons, Jimmy, Victor, Fraser, Willie and Allan the basic rudiments of boxing and forged a family legacy in a makeshift corrugated iron gymnasium in the backyard of his home in Benoni. All of the Toweel brothers achieved success in the boxing world: Willie won an Olympic bronze medal and fought for a world title, Allan was a top trainer, Maurice an outstanding matchmaker and Jimmy a South African champion.

Toweel was an instinctive boxer who, at his best, flaunted incredible stamina, perfect balance and a blazing work ethic. His greatest asset as a fighter was his ability to throw non-stop batteries of punches without tiring.

Amateur career

Toweel was a very successful amateur, winning Springbok colours, and compiling an unbelievable record of 188 wins with only two losses - 160 by knock out. He won East Rand, Transvaal and SA junior and senior titles from 1941 to 1948 and was No 1 choice for the 1948 Olympic team. He competed in the 1948 Summer Olympics in London in the bantamweight competition, but was eliminated in the first round by Arnoldo Parés of Argentina in a controversial decision.

Pro career

Soon after returning from the Olympics, Toweel turned professional. He made his professional debut on 29 January 1949, stopping Johannes Landman in the second round, the same night his brother Jimmy won the national lightweight title. Two wins inside the distance over Herby Andre and Kalla Persson followed.

In his fourth professional fight Toweel won the SA bantamweight title when veteran Jimmy Webster was disqualified in the third round for holding.

In his ninth fight, he became the SA featherweight champion. He captured the British Empire Bantamweight Title, in his 11th fight.

On 31 May 1950, in his 14th fight, at the age of 21, he won the world bantamweight championship.

Fighting using nicknames including "Dynamite," "Benoni's Mighty Mouse," the "Benoni Buzzaw," and the "white Henry Armstrong" for his constant attack fighting style, Toweel beat Word bantamweight champion Manuel Ortiz, who was recognised as one of the greatest bantamweight champions of all time. At that stage, Manuel Ortiz was a veteran of 110 fights whereas Vic had had only fought 13 contests as a professional.

During his reign as a world champion, Toweel had 13 bouts consisting of three successful title defences and 10 successful non-title fights against world rated contenders.

He successfully defended his world title against Danny O'Sullivan (KO 10 round) whom he dropped 14 times, winning him a place in the Guinness Book of Records, for the most knock downs in a world title fight. His second and third title defences were against Luis Romero (won in 15 rounds) and Peter Keenan (won in 15 rounds). A drastically weight-weakened Vic was dethroned by Australian Jimmy Carruthers in his fourth title defence, Toweel losing by a first round knockout.

Carruthers gave Toweel a return match on 21 March 1953 and a crowd of 35,000 saw him holding his own until the sixth round, when he began to fade. He was counted out in the tenth.

Toweel's eyes were giving him trouble and he went to London where a successful operation was performed.

On his return he announced that he would continue fighting as a featherweight. On 11 December 1953 he outpointed British featherweight champion Ronnie Clayton before losing on points to highly regarded Carmelo Costa in New York.

On 6 November 1953 Vic had his last fight, in the welterweight division, when he stopped Harry Walker in the eighth.

After years of battling with his weight and only two months short of his 27th birthday, he decided to hang up his gloves with a professional record was 28-3-1 (14).

Toweel was SA's first and so-far only undisputed world boxing champion.

Life after boxing
Toweel retired to Australia in the 1980s and died aged 79 in Sydney, Australia, on Friday morning 15 August 2008.

Professional boxing record

See also
List of bantamweight boxing champions

References

External links
 
 sports-reference.com
 Vic Toweel - CBZ Profile

1928 births
2008 deaths
Flyweight boxers
Olympic boxers of South Africa
Boxers at the 1948 Summer Olympics
World bantamweight boxing champions
People from Benoni
South African people of Lebanese descent
Sportspeople of Lebanese descent
South African male boxers
Sportspeople from Gauteng